Nijazi Ramadani (born February 14, 1964 in Kokaj, Kosovo, Yugoslavia) is a Kosovar Albanian poet, novelist and literary critic.

Education 
He completed high school in Gjilan. He then graduated from the University of Prishtina's Faculty of Education where he completed a degree in Mathematics and Information Technology.

Work and activity
Ramadani edited the periodical Ushtima e maleve, which was described by the Yugoslav authorities as hostile and irredentist. Due to this, and his political alignment with the national movement, Ramadani was arrested and imprisoned in 1981.

He began his poetic writings during the 1980s. He was among the best-known modern representatives of contemporary verse in Kosovo.

Ramadani is known as a literary creator, where his literary creativity is mainly focused on the treatment of national motives, respectively the topic of patriotism. 

His main interests lie in literary, journalistic, cultural and political writings, which he occasionally publishes in Albanian dailies and periodicals. He has written for the daily Rilindja, the literary magazines Jeta e Re, Pionieri, Flaka in Skopje, Haemus in Bucharest, and Athina in Athens, along with the Albanian newspapers Shekulli, Koha onna, Bujku and Euro-Rilindja among others. Since 2000, he was worked for the Kosovan daily Epoka e Re and his articles have appeared in papers such as Express, Infopress and the news agency Kosova press. He worked as editor-in-chief at the temporary "Ushtima e maleve" (2001-2002), and the editorial offices of Radio-Albana (in Kumanovë) and Ajo Rinia as a journalist. Some of his works have been translated into other languages.

He is the author of ten books on literature, theater, visual arts and literary criticism, fiction, short stories, novels and drama. He is a member of Kosova Writers Association. He lives and continues to work in Gjilan.

Notable works 

  Albanian geography,poetry, 1995, publisher: Jeta e Re, Prishtina
  Kosovo and self-determination, 1998, publisher:editing "Rrjedha"(as co-author)
  Time image ( poetry), 2008, publishing house Rrjedha, Gjilan
  Other accept of theater(), 2008, editing-(publisher):
  Alive image, drama-comedy 2013, publisher: Rrjedha, Prishtina (MKRS)
  Frozen image, roman, 2010, publisher: Rrjedha, Prishtina
 Kokaj monograph 1842–2012" , monograph 2012, publisher:, Gjilan
 NIJAZI RAMADANI|- Shtegtim në histori I Gjilani lëvizja dhe rezistenca kombëtare në juglindje të Kosovës 1941 - edit Rrjedha 2020^
 “ THJERRËZ ”, poetry,  publisher: "Rrjedha", 2019 Gjilan

References

External links
 

1964 births
Living people
People from Gjilan
Yugoslav people of Albanian descent
Kosovan non-fiction writers
Yugoslav non-fiction writers
Albanian male writers
Albanian non-fiction writers
21st-century Albanian writers
Kosovan writers
Albanian novelists
Albanian literary critics
Kosovan literary critics
Yugoslav literary critics
Kosovan poets
Yugoslav poets
20th-century Albanian poets
21st-century Albanian poets
Albanian-language poets
Kosovan journalists
Albanian journalists
Yugoslav journalists
Kosovan screenwriters
Albanian screenwriters
Yugoslav screenwriters
Kosovo Albanians
Kosovan ethnographers
Albanian ethnographers
Yugoslav ethnographers
20th-century Albanian scientists
21st-century Albanian scientists